Estefania Muñoz Jaramillo is a Colombian model and beauty pageant titleholder who was crowned as Miss Earth Colombia 2015 and represented Colombia at Miss Earth 2015 placed Top 8.

Pageantry

Reinado Internacional del Café 2014
Estefania Muñoz first represented Colombia through Reinado Internacional del Café 2014 pageant held in Colombia. She finished as 1st Runner-Up with Priscilla Durand of Brazil gaining the title.

Aside from finishing a runner up, Estefania was able to receive some awards as well such as "Best Face" award and was one of "2014 Queen of Carabineros" recipients.

Miss Earth 2015
Estefania competed at Miss Earth 2015 and placed Top 8.

References

External links
Miss Earth Colombia official website
Miss Earth Colombia official Facebook page
Miss Earth official website

Living people
Miss Earth 2015 contestants
Colombian beauty pageant winners
People from Medellín
1993 births